Toni Hallio is the former drummer for and one of the founding members of melodic death metal band Norther. He left the band in October 2005 to pursue other interests. However, he still recorded the drums for Norther's Till Death Unites Us instead of the band's current drummer Heikki Saari.

Discography

Studio albums
Dreams of Endless War (2002)
Mirror of Madness (2003)
Death Unlimited (2004)
Till Death Unites Us (2006)

Demos and EPs
Warlord (demo) (2000)
Solution 7 (2005)

Singles
Released (2002)
Unleash Hell (2003)
Spreading Death (2004)
Spreading Death (DVD) (2004)
Scream (2006)

External links
Official Norther website

References

1980 births
Living people
Finnish heavy metal drummers
Musicians from Helsinki
21st-century drummers
Norther members